Hôtel du Tillet de la Bussière is a historic hôtel particulier in the 6th arrondissement. It was built in the 18th century. It has been listed as an official historical monument since March 29, 1928.

References

Tillet de la Bussière
Houses completed in the 18th century
Buildings and structures in the 6th arrondissement of Paris
18th-century architecture in France